Anthony Astley Cooper Rogers (February 14, 1821 – July 27, 1899) was an American politician. He served one term in the House of Representative from Arkansas from 1869 to 1871.

Biography 
Born in Clarksville, Tennessee, Rogers received a limited schooling.  He engaged in mercantile pursuits.
He moved to Arkansas in 1854.  An opponent of Secession, he was a candidate of supporters of the Union as a delegate to the State convention in 1861.  He was arrested for his loyalty, imprisoned, and forced to give bond to answer the charge of "treason against the Confederate Government."

Rogers was elected to the 38th United States Congress, but was not allowed to take his seat, his State not having been readmitted.  In 1864, he moved to Chicago, Illinois, and engaged in the real estate business.  He returned to Arkansas in 1868.

Congress 
Rogers was elected as a Democrat to the 41st Congress, March 4, 1869, to March 3, 1871.  He was an unsuccessful candidate for reelection in 1870 to the 42nd Congress.  He was postmaster at Pine Bluff, Arkansas, from January 7, 1881, to July 24, 1885, and again engaged in mercantile pursuits.

Death 
In 1888, he moved to Los Angeles, where he died the following year at the age of 78. He is interred in Angelus-Rosedale Cemetery.

References

 
 

1821 births
1899 deaths
Businesspeople from Tennessee
American real estate businesspeople
Arkansas postmasters
People from Clarksville, Tennessee
Politicians from Pine Bluff, Arkansas
Democratic Party members of the United States House of Representatives from Arkansas
Burials at Angelus-Rosedale Cemetery
Southern Unionists in the American Civil War
19th-century American politicians
19th-century American businesspeople